Edmund Harvey was a politician and soldier.

Edmund Harvey may also refer to:

Edmund Harvey (footballer) (1900–?), English footballer
Edmund Arthur Harvey (1907–1994), British-Australian artist
Edmund Harvey (social reformer) (1875–1955), British politician and social reformer
Edmund Harvey (cricketer) (1852–1902), English cricketer
E. Newton Harvey (1887–1959), American zoologist

See also